Royal Huisman is a Dutch shipbuilding company that specializes in the newbuild  construction and refit, rebuild and renewal of sailing and motor yachts.

The shipyard was established in 1884 in Ronduite as a builder of wooden workboats and fishing boats. In 1954 Jan Huisman specialised in steel sailing yachts, and his son Wolter transitioned to aluminium hulls in 1964 with the 30 ft Van de Stadt Avenir series. In the 1970s the development of extruded aluminum masts and cooperation with New York designers Sparkman & Stephens (S&S) enabled Huisman to tap into performance yachts and the international racing circuit: The shipyard launched its largest yacht to date, the prize-winning 60 ft S&S sloop Running Tide, at its new deep-water premises in Vollenhove in 1970. In 1973 Huisman built Albert Henri Karl Büll's first Saudade, the 47 ft S&S sloop which won the Admiral's Cup for Germany in the same year. In 1976, the shipyard built Conny van Rietschoten's 65 ft S&S ketch Flyer for the 1977–78 Whitbread Round the World Race, which she won. Their success was repeated in the 1981–82 Whitbread race with van Rietschoten's new 76 ft Frers-designed sloop Flyer II which took line honours in all four legs.

In turn the shipyard developed successfully in Maxi yachts and large cruising yachts with designers Germán Frers and Ron Holland. Upon its hundredth anniversary in 1984 the shipyard was awarded a royal charter by Queen Beatrix and changed its name to Royal Huisman. In 1989 the shipyard set a new trend of large classic yacht revival by cooperating with designer Gerard Dijkstra to restore Elizabeth Meyer's prestigious 1934 J-class yacht Endeavour. The restoration as well as a number of Royal Huisman's subsequent projects received industry awards from yacht owners and the press. The shipyard launched the 112 ft sloop Pamina, the World's first yacht built from the high temper aluminium alloy Alustar, in the year 2000. The shipyard's flagship Athena was handed over in 2004 to repeat client, Dr. Jim Clark, who also ordered Hyperion (1998). 

The shipyard has been taking care of superyacht refit on an occasional basis during previous years when the shipyard broadened its business model with the official expansion of superyacht refit and repair in 2011. Huisfit, the new name for the services of this division is introduced. The Huisfit team has been taking care of various non-Royal Huisman yachts such as Karyatis (107 ft Heesen), EOS (305 ft Lürssen), Skat (232 ft Lürssen), Red Sula (105 ft Jongert), Heartbeat (78 ft Claasen), Nixe II, Be Mine (132 ft Lürssen), Adèle (180 ft Vitters) as well as Royal Huisman yachts like Juliet, Borkumriff IV,  Unfurled, Antares, Hyperion, Flyer, Arcadia, Surama (ex William Tai), Hyperion, Gliss, and many more.

In 2014 Royal Huisman became a co-owner of the Bucket Regattas. and in the same year the shipyard affiliated with Royal Doeksen, another Dutch maritime service organisation owned and run by the fourth generation of the same family. 

The shipyard had a workforce of 280 people in 2016. The 139 ft SAMURAI was also delivered early 2016: Huisfit and the advanced composites division converted this 40-knot carbonfibre stripped-out speed machine (ex-Mari-Cha IV) into a luxurious yet high performance superyacht. The 65 ft S&S sloop Aileen II, constructed entirely of pre-preg carbon fibre, is launched in 2017. The owner’s brief was for a classic cruiser with modern performance to be sailed single-handed including anchoring, mooring and manoeuvring. Furthermore, the owner’s aim was for the yacht to have the same quality level and comfort as usually found in a much larger superyacht. 

Construction takes place in a 30,000m² purpose-built facility with four building halls, a paint hall, a refit hall as well as manufacturing halls operated by Rondal, a subsidiary of Royal Huisman specialized in furlers, winches, deck fittings and pre-impregnated carbonfiber spars and superyacht components. The shipyard facilities are extended to the Amsterdam region at the 12,000m premises of the former Holland Jachtbouw in  2019. This second location for Royal Huisman serves as an addition to the existing headquarters in Vollenhove.

In 2020 the 81 meter contemporary schooner - the world's largest aluminum sailing yacht - SEA EAGLE II was delivered to her Owner, Dr. Samuel Yin.

List of yachts built
Below is a list of all the yachts built by Royal Huisman:

See also
List of large sailing yachts
Feadship - another Dutch shipyard with a royal charter
Royal IHC - another Dutch shipyard with a royal charter
Royal Bodewes - another Dutch shipyard with a royal charter

References

Companies established in 1884
Yacht building companies
Shipbuilding companies of the Netherlands
Dutch brands